Emerson dos Santos da Luz (born 11 July 1982 in Mindelo) is a Cape Verdean footballer who currently plays for Canelas 2010.

Career 
He played a total of 37 games and scored 3 goals in the Portugal top division Primeira Liga while playing for Estrela da Amadora and Beira-Mar. His only experience outside Portugal is in the Romanian top division Liga I at Gloria Bistriţa.

References

External links

 Zerozero.pt
 beiramar.pt

1982 births
Living people
People from Mindelo
Cape Verdean footballers
Cape Verde international footballers
Primeira Liga players
Liga Portugal 2 players
Liga I players
Expatriate footballers in Portugal
Cape Verdean expatriate sportspeople in Portugal
Expatriate footballers in Romania
Cape Verdean expatriate sportspeople in Romania
Association football midfielders
Portimonense S.C. players
F.C. Arouca players
S.C. Beira-Mar players
C.F. Estrela da Amadora players
S.C. Olhanense players
Boavista F.C. players
ACF Gloria Bistrița players